Đà Nẵng University of Architecture (in Vietnamese: Đại học Kiến trúc Đà Nẵng) is a private university in Đà Nẵng city, Central Vietnam. It was established on November 27, 2006. The university offers undergraduate courses in a number of fields:

Architecture
Architecture
Urban planning
Home design
Interior decor

Arts
Graphic design
Fashion
Painting
Sculpture

Engineering
Civil engineering
Transportation engineering
Construction management

References

Đồ gỗ mỹ nghệ Tây Nguyên quản trị fanpage

External links
 Official website 

Universities in Da Nang